The  is a 17.6 km Japanese railway line in Aichi Prefecture which connects Kira Yoshida Station in Nishio, with Gamagōri Station in Gamagōri. It is owned by the private railway operator Nagoya Railroad (Meitetsu) and operated as an extension of the Meitetsu Nishio Line. Fare calculation classification is B (actual distance × 1.15).

Stations
All stations are located in Aichi Prefecture.

History

The Kira Yoshida to Mikawa Toba section was opened by the Mikawa Railway in 1929, electrified at 1,500 V DC. It was extended (but not electrified) to Gamagōri in 1936. The company merged with Meitetsu in 1941, which in 1943 lowered the voltage on the Kira Yoshida to Mikawa Toba section to 600 V DC to permit through-running with the Meitetsu Nishio Line.

The Mikawa Toba to Gamagōri section was electrified between 1946 and 1947, and in 1959 the voltage was increased to 1,500 V DC, through-running on the Nishio Line recommencing when the voltage on that line was raised the following year.

Survival Problems 

In March 2008, Meitetsu asked Nishio, Kira, Hatabe, and Gamagori (Kira town and Hatabe-cho, Nishio City) to show the use activation plan between Nishio – Kira Yoshida – Gamagori on the Nishio line and Gamagori line by the end of the same year.

It is recognized that "there are so few users that the characteristics of railways cannot be demonstrated as a mass transit system", and that the corporate efforts on the Meitetsu side had already exceeded the limits.

On December 19, 1997, Meitetsu President Muneyoshi Minoura said at a regular press conference that he wanted to discuss the arrangement and unification of unprofitable routes with the relevant local governments, and was cited as a route to be abolished along with the Tanigumi Line and the Yaotsu Line. The rationalization of the one-man operation introduction and the unmanned station of the station on the way was done.

However, due to the continued vicious cycle of reducing the number of passengers and the number of direct-line trains, the Meitetsu Nishio and Gamagori Line Countermeasures Council was established on December 20, 2005.

Here, Meitetsu said that two stations in the Gamagori line and Nishio Line, with the introduction of automatic ticket gates for the new system, are in the direction of abolition due to difficulty maintaining from installation costs. The reason supruled "the number of passengers on the day is less than 300" and "stations other than urban areas" were announced. The method of showing this specific numerical value was also performed on the Gamagori Line, "whereas the measure of transport ation density is 4,000 people / day is an indicator to examine the conversion to the bus, etc., the Gamagori line is 2857 people / day 2005 year 2005", and strongly smelled the waste line. On the other hand, the local government along the line requested the continuation.

The following arrangements were made at the 8th Council for Measures to Be Held in November 2010:

1. In order to maintain the continued use of the Nishio-Gamagori Line, the city and towns along the line will provide support for a portion of the necessary expenses for Meitetsu for three years (from fiscal 2010 to fiscal 2012).

2. The three parties of The City and Aichi Prefecture and Meitetsu will cooperate with local groups, schools, companies, etc. along the line to promote the use of such activities as various awareness-raising activities and the improvement of the environment.

As a result, Nishio city and Gamagori city raised the support of 150 million yen per year, and Aichi Prefecture provided a total of 83 million yen annually to both cities. Currently, subsequent consultations have decided to continue the route with local government support until fiscal 2020. Tranpass and manaca are not introduced.

References
This article incorporates material from the corresponding article in the Japanese Wikipedia.

Rail transport in Aichi Prefecture
Gamagori Line
Railway lines opened in 1936
1067 mm gauge railways in Japan